is a Japanese judoka.

She participated at the 2018 World Judo Championships, winning a medal.

In 2019, she won the silver medal in the women's 57 kg event at the Judo World Masters held in Qingdao, China.

References

External links
 
 

1994 births
Living people
Japanese female judoka
Sportspeople from Hokkaido
World judo champions
People from Iwamizawa, Hokkaido
Judoka at the 2018 Asian Games
Asian Games gold medalists for Japan
Asian Games medalists in judo
Medalists at the 2018 Asian Games
20th-century Japanese women
21st-century Japanese women